Meiron Amir Cheruti (born 19 October 1997) is an Israeli swimmer. He competes in 100 m freestyle, 50 m butterfly, 50 m freestyle, 4x100 m freestyle, and 4x50 m freestyle. He qualified to represent Israel at the 2020 Summer Olympics.

Swimming career
Cheruti started swimming at the age of five, and his club is Maccabi Haifa. He competes in 100 m freestyle, 50 m butterfly, 50 m freestyle, 4x100 m freestyle, and 4x50 m freestyle. He is a member of Project Rising Star, a program that coach David Marsh created with the Israel Swimming Association.

2018-present
In December 2018, at the 2018 Arena Israeli Swimming Championships, he won and set Israeli short course national records in the 50 m freestyle (21.27) and the 100 m freestyle (47.41).

In April 2019, at the Israel Cup, he won the 50 m freestyle. That same month at the Stockholm Open Cheruti won a silver medal in the 50 m freestyle. In June 2019 at the Sette Colli Trophy he set a new Israeli national record in the 50 m butterfly, at 23.65. In July 2019 he competed in the men's 50 m butterfly at the 2019 World Aquatics Championships in Gwangju, South Korea.

See also
List of Israeli records in swimming

References

External links
 
 
 Meiron Cheruti at isrSwimming.com
 Meiron Cheruti at SwimCloud.com

1997 births
Living people
Competitors at the 2022 Maccabiah Games
Israeli male swimmers
Place of birth missing (living people)
Swimmers at the 2015 European Games
European Games competitors for Israel
Israeli male freestyle swimmers
Male butterfly swimmers
Swimmers at the 2020 Summer Olympics
Olympic swimmers of Israel